Najee Glass (born June 12, 1994) is an American sprinter and former American football wide receiver.

A native of Woodbridge Township, New Jersey, Glass attended St. Peter's Preparatory School, and is a senior at the University of Florida.

Glass finished sixth in the 400 m at the 2010 Summer Youth Olympics.

Glass was part of the US medley relay team that established a new World Youth best at the 2011 World Youth Championships in Athletics running a 31-second 300 m leg.

On February 26, 2012, Glass ran 46.06 to win the Brooks PR Invitational. His time was good for a Dempsey record (fastest of any collegiate or professional runner) and a US #1. A few weeks later on March 11, 2012, Glass became the 2012 Indoor National Champion.  His time 46.57 was good for number 4 all-time.

He was an All-USA high school track and field team selection by USA Today in 2011.

Glass is a six-time USTFCCCA Indoor and Outdoor All-American. He also won USTFCCCA South Region Indoor Athlete of the Year.

While at the University of Florida, Glass was a part of the winning 4 × 400 m team at the 2013 NCAA Division I Outdoor National Championships. He captured the 2015 SEC Indoor 400 m title. Glass was a part of the winning 4 × 400 m team at the 2015 SEC Outdoor Championships.

Competition record

References

External links

DyeStat profile for Najee Glass
Florida Gators bio

 

1994 births
Living people
American football wide receivers
American male sprinters
Athletes (track and field) at the 2010 Summer Youth Olympics
People from Woodbridge Township, New Jersey
Sportspeople from Jersey City, New Jersey
Sportspeople from Middlesex County, New Jersey
St. Peter's Preparatory School alumni
Track and field athletes from New Jersey
Youth Olympic gold medalists in athletics (track and field)
Players of American football from Jersey City, New Jersey